The Global Film Initiative (GFI) was a non-profit film organization that supported cinematic works from developing nations and promotes cross-cultural understanding through use of film and non-traditional learning resources.  Its most notable programs are the Global Lens Film Series, a traveling film-series that premieres annually at the Museum of Modern Art, New York and is accompanied by educational screening-programs for high school students, and the Granting program, which has awarded numerous grants to narrative film-projects from around the world, many of which have been nominated as official country selections for the Academy Award for Best International Feature Film category of the Academy Awards.

The Global Film Initiative was founded by Susan Coulter Weeks in 2002 and is advised by a board of directors, and a film-board composed of filmmakers such as Mira Nair, Lars von Trier, Pedro Almodóvar, Bela Tarr, Carlos Reygadas, Christopher Doyle, and Djamshed Usmonov. In 2004, it entered into a partnership with First Run Features for distribution of all films in the Global Lens Film Series, and in 2006, it moved its offices from the West Village of New York to the Potrero Hill district of San Francisco, California (USA). Their office is currently located in the Ninth Street Independent Film Center in San Francisco.

GFI Programs

Global Lens is a traveling film series composed of cinematic works from developing nations or regions (i.e. Africa, Latin America, Asia, the Middle East, Oceania, etc.).  It shows up to ten narrative feature-films a year, premiering annually at the Museum of Modern Art, New York in late-January, following its premiere the series is screened in fifteen to twenty cities across the United States, in collaboration with various cultural and cinematic organizations and institutions, before going into general distribution through GFI's distribution-partner, First Run Features.

The Acquisitions program acquires eight to ten feature-length narrative films per year for presentation in the Global Lens Film Series.  Films acquired by GFI are discovered through the Granting program and also through independent festivals and sales-initiatives, such as the International Film Festival Rotterdam, Berlinale, and CineMart, and all films are selected for their artistic excellence, authentic self-representation and accomplished storytelling.  Documentary and/or short films are not considered.

The Granting program awards up to twenty grants each year to filmmakers whose projects are nearing completion or in post-production.  Projects awarded grants by the Global Film Initiative are often acquired for presentation in the Global Lens Film Series, and since its inception, the Granting program has supported the production of a number of award-winning films, many of which have been nominated as official country selections in the Foreign Language category of the Academy of Motion Picture Arts and Sciences' awards ceremony, the Academy Awards.

Global Lens 2011 
(Films listed in alphabetical order)

A Useful Life (La Vida Útil) by Federico Veiroj, Uruguay, 2010
Belvedere by Ahmed Imamović, Bosnia & Herzegovina, 2010
Dooman River by Zhang Lu, China, 2009
Soul of Sand (Pairon Talle) by Sidharth Srinivasan, India, 2010
Street Days (Quchis Dgeebi) by  Levan Koguashvili, Georgia, 2010
The Invisible Eye (La Mirada Invisible) by Diego Lerman, Argentina, 2010
The Tenants (Os Inquilinos) by Sérgio Bianchi, Brazil, 2009
The White Meadows (Keshtzar Haye Sepid) by Mohammad Rasoulof, Iran, 2009
The Light Thief (Svet-Ake) by Aktan Arym Kubat, Kyrgyzstan, 2010

Global Lens 2010 

Adrift (Choi Voi) by Bui Thac Chuyen, Vietnam, 2009
Becloud (Vaho) by Alejandro Gerber Bicecci, Mexico, 2009
Gods (Dioses) by Josué Méndez, Peru, 2008
Leo's Room (El Cuarto De Leo) by Enrique Buchichio, Uruguay, 2009
Masquerades (Mascarades) by Lyes Salem, Algeria, 2008
My Tehran for Sale by Granaz Moussavi, Iran, 2009
Ocean of an Old Man by Rajesh Shera, India, 2008
Ordinary People by Vladimir Perisic, Serbia, 2009
The Shaft (Dixia De Tiankong) by Zhang Chi, China, 2008
Shirley Adams by Oliver Hermanus, South Africa, 2009

Global Lens 2009 

Getting Home (Luo Ye Gui Gen) by Zhang Yang, China, 2007
I Am From Titov Veles (Jas Sum Od Titov Veles) by Teona Strugar Mitevska, Macedonia, 2007
Mutum by Sandra Kogut, Brazil, 2007
My Time Will Come (Cuando Me Toque A Mi) by Víctor Arregui, Ecuador, 2008
The Photograph by Nan Achnas, Indonesia, 2007
Possible Lives (Las Vidas Possibles) by Sandra Gugliotta, Argentina, 2007
Sleepwalking Land (Terra Sonâmbula) by Teresa Prata, Mozambique, 2007
Song From the Southern Seas (Pesn' Juzhnykh Morej) by Marat Sarulu, Kazakhstan, 2008
Those Three (An Seh) by Naghi Nemati, Iran, 2007
What A Wonderful World by Faouzi Bensaïdi, Morocco, 2006

Global Lens 2008 

All for Free (Sve Džaba) by Antonio Nuić, Croatia, 2006
The Bet Collector (Kubrador) by Jeffrey Jeturian, Philippines, 2006
Bunny Chow by John Barker, South Africa, 2006
The Custodian (El Custodio) by Rodrigo Moreno, Argentina, 2006
The Fish Fall in Love (Mahiha Ashegh Mishavand) by Ali Raffi, Iran, 2006
Kept and Dreamless (Las Mantenidas Sin Sueos) by Vera Fogwill and Martín Desalvo, Argentina, 2005
The Kite (Le Cerf-Volant) by Randa Chahal Sabbag, Lebanon, 2004
Let The Wind Blow (Hava Aney Dey) by Partho Sen-Gupta, India, 2005
Wang Chao (Jiang Cheng Xia Ri) by Wang Chao, China, 2006
Opera Jawa by Garin Nugroho, Indonesia, 2006
 The fifth string (La 5ème corde) by  Selma Bargach , Morocco, 2010

Global Lens 2007
 Another Man's Garden (O Jardim do Outro Homem) by João Luis Sol de Carvalho, Mozambique, 2006
 Dam Street (Hong Yan) by Li Yu, China, 2005
 On Each Side (A Cada Lado) by Hugo Grosso, Argentina, 2006
 Enough! (Barakat!) by Djamila Sahraoui, Algeria, 2006
 Fine Dead Girls (Fine Mertve Djevojke) by Dalibor Matanić, Croatia, 2002
 Kilometre Zero by Hiner Saleem, Iraqi Kurdistan, 2005
 Of Love and Eggs (Rindu Kami Padamu) by Garin Nugroho, Indonesia, 2004
 The Sacred Family (La Sagrada Familia) by Sebastián Campos, Chile, 2005
 A Wonderful Night in Split (Ta Divna Splitska Noc) by Arsen Anton Ostojic, Croatia, 2004
Global Shorts 2007, from Various Directors

Global Lens 2006
 Almost Brothers (Quase Dois Irmãos) by Lúcia Murat, Brazil, 2004
 Border Cafe (Café Transit) by Kambozia Partovi, Iran, 2005
 Cinema, Aspirins and Vultures (Cinema, Aspirinas e Urubus) by Marcelo Gomes, Brazil, 2005
 In the Battlefields (Dans les Champs de Bataille) by Danielle Arbid, Lebanon, 2004
 Max and Mona by Teddy Mattera, South Africa, 2004
 The Night of Truth (La Nuit de la Verite) by Fanta Régina Nacro, Burkina Faso, 2004
 Stolen Life by Li Shaohong, China, 2005
 Thirst (Atash)' by Tawfik Abu Wael, Israel/Palestine, 2004
 Global Shorts 2006, from Various Directors

Global Lens 2005
 Buffalo Boy by Nguyen-Vô Nghiem-Minh, Vietnam, 2004
 Daughter of Keltoum (La Fille de Keltoum) by Mehdi Charef, Algeria, 2001
 Fuse (Gori Vatra) by Pjer Zalica, Bosnia-Herzegovina, 2003
 Hollow City (Na Cidade Vazia) by Maria João Ganga, Angola, 2004
 Kabala by Assane Kouyaté, Mali, 2002
 Lili's Apron (El Delantal de Lili) by Mariano Galperin, Argentina, 2004
 Uniform by Diao Yinan, China, 2003
 What's a Human Anyway by Reha Erdem, Turkey, 2004
 Whisky by Juan Pablo Rebella and Pablo Stoll, Uruguay, 2004
 Today and Tomorrow (Hoy y Mañana) by Alejandro Chomski, Argentina, 2003

Global Lens 2004/2003
 Angel on the Right (Farishtay Kitfi Rost) by Djamshed Usmonov, Tajikistan, 2002
 Khorma by Saadi, Tunisia, 2002
 Mango Yellow by Cláudio Assis, Brazil, 2002
 Margarette's Feast (A Festa de Margarette) by Renato Falcão, Brazil, 2002
 Nothing More (NADA +) by Juan Carlos Cremata Malberti, Cuba, 2001
 Rachida by Yamina Bachir-Chouikh, Algeria, 2002
 Shadow Kill (Nizhalkkuthu) by Adoor Gopalakrishnan, India, 2002
 Ticket to Jerusalem by Rashid Masharawi, Palestine, 2002
 Women's Prison by Manijeh Hekmat, Iran, 2002
 Wretched Lives (Hubog)'' by Joel Lamangan, Philippines, 2001

References

 The Global Film Initiative

External links
 GFI & First Run Features: Special Collections: Global Lens
 Global Film Initiative: Making a Reel Difference (MovieScope Magazine)

Film organizations in the United States